Miss Universe Philippines 2021 was the second edition of the Miss Universe Philippines pageant. The coronation night of the pageant was held on September 30, 2021 at the Henann Resort Convention Center in Alona Beach, Panglao, Bohol, Philippines. Originally scheduled to be held on September 25, 2021, the event was postponed to September 30, 2021 due to the sudden surge of COVID-19 cases in the Philippines. 

The coronation night was exclusively livestreamed by ABS-CBN through KTX.ph on September 30, 2021 with a delayed telecast on GMA Network on October 3, 2021. Rabiya Mateo of Iloilo City crowned Beatrice Luigi Gomez of Cebu City as her successor at the end of the event. Gomez represented the Philippines at the Miss Universe 2021 pageant in Eilat, Israel in December 2021, where she placed in the Top 5.

Background

Location and date
On July 14, 2021, the organization announced that the coronation for the Miss Universe Philippines 2021 pageant will be on September 25, 2021.

On September 19, 2021, the organization announced that the coronation night set on September 25, 2021 was postponed due to the COVID-19 pandemic.

On September 24, 2021, it was announced that the finals would be held on September 30, 2021 at the Henann Resort Convention Center in Alona Beach, Panglao, Bohol.

Selection of participants
On May 8, 2021, the organization launched its search for the next Filipina who will represent the Philippines at the Miss Universe 2021 competition. The final submission of application was on July 15, 2021.

Top 100
On July 19, the organization announced its Top 100 delegates. They competed in a headshot challenge and a video introduction challenge. Votes via the Miss Universe Philippines app and the scores of the board of judges determine the Top 75 delegates that was announced on August 8, 2021.

Top 75
On August 8, 2021, the organization announced its Top 75 delegates. They competed in a runway challenge and a casting video challenge. Votes via the Miss Universe Philippines app and the scores of the board of judges determined the Top 50 delegates that was announced on August 22, 2021.

Top 50
On August 22, 2021, the organization announced its Top 50 delegates. They competed in a virtual interview challenge.

Top 30
On September 1, 2021, the organization announced its Top 30 delegates. Three delegates advanced to the Top 30 through online voting on the Miss Universe Philippines app and 27 delegates were chosen based from all of the challenges which were scored by the panel of experts. These thirty delegates will compete live and in-person for the coronation night.
 

 
On September 13, 2021, Joanna Marie Rabe of Zambales withdrew from the competition due to dengue fever. On September 19, 2021, Ybonne Ortega of Davao City withdrew from the competition after testing positive for COVID-19.

Results

Placements

§ – Lazada Fan Vote Winner

Major awards

Special awards

Pageant

New format
On July 14, 2021, the Miss Universe Philippines organization announced a new format for the 2021 pageant. 100 delegates will be initially chosen. The 100 delegates will undergo different challenges where they will reduced to 75, then 50, and then 30. The 30 remaining delegates will compete live and in-person for the coronation night.

National Costume competition
On September 23, 2021, the national costume competition of the 28 delegates premiered on YouTube as a music video featuring the new BGYO track "Kulay". For this edition's national costume competition, the Miss Universe Philippines organization decided to pay tribute to Manila Carnival queens, an annual pre-World War II national exposition, carnival, and pageant in Manila that celebrated products of Philippine provinces. This years' national costumes were all inspired by the pre-war pageantry, while donning elements that represent their provinces and cities.

Preliminary competition
Originally, the preliminary interviews was scheduled for September 21, 2021 and the preliminary swimsuit and evening gown competition would be on September 23, 2021 but was moved to later dates due to the COVID-19 pandemic.  The preliminary interviews was later streamed on September 24, 2021 and the preliminary swimsuit and evening gown competition on September 26, 2021 thru KTX.ph.

Judges
 Sam Verzosa – CEO and Co-Founder of Frontrow Philippines
 Shamcey Supsup-Lee – Miss Universe Philippines 2011 and National Director of Miss Universe Philippines Organization
 Jonas Gaffud – Creative Director of  Miss Universe Philippines Organization

Final program
On September 19, 2021, the organization announced that the coronation night set on September 25, 2021 was postponed due to the COVID-19 pandemic.

On September 24, 2021, it was announced that the finals would be held on September 30, 2021 at the Henann Resort Convention Center in Alona Beach, Panglao, Bohol.

The coronation night was hosted by American radio DJ and actor KC Montero. Filipino singers Sam Concepcion and Michael Pangilinan performed as musical guests.

Judges
 Joanne Golong-Gomez – Commercial Director of Hilton Manila
 Sam Verzosa – CEO and Co-Founder of Frontrow Philippines
 Vicki Belo – Founder and Medical Director of The Belo Medical Group
 Jojie Lloren – Former President of the Young Designers Guild and The Fashion and Design Council of the Philippines
 Sheila Romero – Vice Chairman of Philippines AirAsia

Contestants
Delegates:

Notes

Withdrawals
 Joanna Marie Rabe of Zambales – On September 13, 2021, Rabe withdrew from the competition after catching dengue fever.
 Ybonne Ortega of Davao City – On September 19, 2021, Ortega withdrew from the competition after testing positive for COVID-19.

References

External links

2021 beauty pageants
2021 in the Philippines
Beauty pageants in the Philippines
2021